"Bonkers" is a song by English rapper Dizzee Rascal and American producer Armand van Helden. It is the first single released from Rascal's fourth studio album, Tongue n' Cheek. Rascal released the track under his own record label, Dirtee Stank Recordings on 17 May 2009 in the United Kingdom, entering at the top of the UK Singles Chart, marking Dizzee's second number-one single, third top-ten single and eleventh top-forty hit on the chart. This was also Van Helden's third number-one single, his first in ten years (with "You Don't Know Me" being his previous number-one single). In October 2011, NME placed it at number 59 on its list "150 Best Tracks of the Past 15 Years".

Background
Armand van Helden emailed Dizzee the music while he was living in the US. Dizzee instantly realised it had potential to be a festival anthem, and wrote the lyrics to it with that in mind, which he claims took him 25 minutes.

The record was selected as Jo Whiley's Pet Sound and Sara Cox's 'Weekend Anthem'. Rascal said in an interview with The Sun newspaper that he is unashamed of the song's pop hooks, and, despite initially having a strong dislike for house music, he has enjoyed making the song. On 5 May 2009, The King Blues chose "Bonkers" as their cover when they were in the Live Lounge with Jo Whiley.

Rascal performed the song live during the opening ceremony of the 2012 London Olympics as part of a montage of British pop music.

Usage in media
The song appeared on the Nintendo DS and Wii video game Need for Speed: Nitro, which takes place in Rio de Janeiro, Cairo, Madrid, Singapore, and Dubai for the Wii version, as well as in Need For Speed: Most Wanted.

The song appeared in the film Kingsman: The Secret Service.

A parody of the song, retitled "Minted", was used in the Horrible Histories sketch about the wealthiest man in ancient Rome, Marcus Licinius Crassus. The lead vocals were performed by Simon Farnaby.

"Bonkers" was used as the track behind the season three trailer for Rick and Morty.

Music video
There is a music video for the song that shows Dizzee Rascal on an inflatable pickup.

Track listings
CD single / 12" vinyl
"Bonkers"  – 3:01
"Bonkers"  – 3:24
"Bonkers"  – 4:29
"Bonkers"  – 5:21
"Bonkers"  – 5:30
"Bonkers"  – 5:53
"Butterfly" – 3:53

Digital download
"Bonkers"  – 3:01
"Bonkers"  – 3:24
"Bonkers"  – 4:29
"Bonkers"  – 5:21
"Bonkers"  – 5:30
"Bonkers"  – 5:53
"Butterfly" – 3:53
"Bonkers"   – 2:56

Bonkers (Remixes) – single
"Bonkers (As Heard on Radio Soulwax Edit)" – 3:45 (Only available in Belgium and The Netherlands)
"Bonkers (Doorly Remix)" – 4:30

Charts

Weekly charts

Year-end charts

Certifications

Release history

References

External links
Listen to "Bonkers"

2009 singles
Dizzee Rascal songs
UK Singles Chart number-one singles
Songs written by Armand Van Helden
2009 songs
Songs written by Dizzee Rascal